Travelstar was a brand of 2.5-inch hard disk drives (HDD) that was manufactured by Western Digital. The brand was originally introduced by IBM in 1994 with the announcement of the Travelstar LP, a 2.5-inch 300MB 12.5 mm high HDD.  IBM began shipping 2.5-inch HDDs in 1990 without this branding.

The brand was adopted and renamed to "HGST Travelstar" by HGST after it acquired IBM's HDD business in 2003 and continued for a while after HGST was acquired by Western Digital, but the HGST prefix is now defunct.

These drives were typically used with laptop computers and small form factor desktop computers. Models are manufactured with capacities up to 1 TB, with rotational speeds of 5400 RPM or 7200 RPM and in 7mm or 9.5mm z-heights. Newer Travelstar drives were manufactured with the Serial ATA interface.

Older models were offered with the PATA interface and some in a 1.8" form factor.

The brand ended in 2012 with the last Travelstar series, the Travelstar Z7K500, which had drive capacities of 250, 320, and 500GB capacities and 32MB of cache with a speed of 7200 RPM.

See also 

 Deskstar
 Ultrastar

References

External links
WD HDD product list

Computer storage devices
Divested IBM products
Hitachi products
IBM storage devices
Western Digital products